The Norwegian Army Air Service (NoAAS) was established in 1914. Its main base and aircraft factory was at Kjeller. On 10 November 1944, the NoAAS merged with the Royal Norwegian Navy Air Service to form the Royal Norwegian Air Force.

Footnotes

See also
FF9 Kaje
Fokker C.V

 
Military units and formations established in 1914
Military units and formations disestablished in 1944
1914 establishments in Norway